Gregory Douglas Brown (born October 23, 1951, died August 29, 2014) is an American painter and native of Palo Alto, California, best known for his trompe-l'œil murals in the San Francisco Bay area.

Biography 

He was born in Pittsburgh, Pennsylvania, but was still a child when he moved to Palo Alto, California. At age 13, he became a pupil of artist Roberto Lupetti. He went to Palo Alto High School, and graduated in 1969. He was the city of Palo Alto's first Artist in Residence.

The Comprehensive Employment and Training Act (CETA), with help from the city of Palo Alto funded Brown's 1970s murals. The first Palo Alto mural by Brown was created in 1975. The trompe-l'œil murals "Palo Alto Pedestrian Series" located in downtown Palo Alto feature imagery such as aliens, burglars, animals, and normal people.

References 

21st-century American painters
Living people
1951 births
American male painters
People from Palo Alto, California
Palo Alto High School alumni
Trompe-l'œil artists